My Illegal Wife is a 2014 Filipino romantic comedy film directed by Tony Y. Reyes starring Pokwang and Zanjoe Marudo. The film, produced by Skylight Films and distributed by Star Cinema officially premiered in the Philippines on June 11, 2014.

Cast

Main cast
Pokwang as Clarisse
Zanjoe Marudo as Henry
 Ellen Adarna as Clarize

Supporting cast
Pooh as Alex
Beauty Gonzalez as Donna
Joy Viado† as Cora
Anita Linda† as Magda
Mikylla Ramirez as Hazel
John Steven De Guzman as Liam
Empoy Marquez as Anjo
Edgar Allan Guzman as Brian
Jimmy Santos as Zossimo
Pilita Corrales as Lala
Jackie Aquino as Dr.Monch
Hyubs Azarcon as Dennis
Jobert Austria as Nelson
Clayton Olalia as Husband of Donna
Mae Paner as Madam(as Mae Paner aka Juana Change)
Inday Garutay as Ice Cream Vendor
Cloyd Robinson as Priest
Grae Fernandez as Teen Henry
 John Bermundo as Teen Brian
Jojo Bolado as OFW Passenger

The Bullies
Justine Banez
Joshua Claridad
Ramon Dinglasan
Ryu Nakayama
Karlo Angelo Nunag

Production

Casting and Development
On May 16, 2014, Star Cinema released news through their website about their next film, topbilled by Marudo and Pokwang with the title: "Coming soon: ‘My Illegal Wife’" and accompanied by a spoof image of ABS-CBN's The Legal Wife primetime series. They first introduced the cast, including Zanjoe Marudo, Pokwang, and Ellen Adarna as well as the storyline.
The film, which started shooting on April 7, is their second film together after Cinco in 2010. In that case, both wanted to do more scenes that will show their improvement as a team, particularly having bed and love scenes on-screen.

The director noted that Marudo can be the next Vic Sotto, who is the "Prince of Comedy", as the director can see his skills on becoming like one. Coincidentally, Marudo is a fan of Sotto.

Promotions
The team had a story reference on March 28 under Skylight Films. During the reference, Pokwang promises that their team-up will bring laughter and kilig. One month when their first shoot on April 7 started, both the main actors excitedly posted exclusive sneak peeks on their Instagram accounts. In the same way, entertainment writer Mell Navarro posted a behind-the-scene photo of one of Pokwang and Marudo's scenes through his Facebook account on May 9.

On May 30, the full trailer of the film was uploaded in YouTube. The team, then, attended their grand press conference on June 2 at 11 a.m., accompanied by a livestream. In addition, the Marudo and Pokwang have had guestings in ABS-CBN to promote their upcoming film, including The Buzz, Gandang Gabi Vice, and ASAP, wherein they had a dance production number on the latter.

Sources
There are numerous television and movies that the film used to spoof. In fact, their title is a spoof of ABS-CBN's The Legal Wife primetime series. Note that only the title is spoofed, not the storyline. Other sources parodied include:
numerous scenes in Got to Believe series
Kim Chiu's line: "Isn't it amazing, isn't it surprising" from Bride for Rent
Bea Alonzo's rain scene in She's the One
Sarah Geronimo in It Takes a Man and a Woman
Piolo Pascual and Toni Gonzaga's confrontation scene in Starting Over Again
Janet Lim Napoles as the head of Philippine-based Yakuza searching for 3 gold plates inserted in Henry's abdomen.
Maja Salvador and Angel Locsin's slapping scene line: "Walang Sa'yo Nicole! Akin Lang ang ASAWA KO!"

References

External links
 My Illegal Wife Official website
 

2014 films
Star Cinema films
Skylight Films films
Philippine parody films
Filipino-language films
2014 romantic comedy films
Philippine romantic comedy films
Films directed by Tony Y. Reyes